The Metropolitan Utilities District, or M.U.D., is the political subdivision and public corporation of the U.S. State of Nebraska that operates the drinking water and natural gas systems for Omaha, Nebraska and surrounding areas. M.U.D. is the only metropolitan utilities district in the State of Nebraska, and the fifth largest public natural gas utility in the U.S.

History
Founded by the Nebraska Legislature as the Metropolitan Water District in 1913, five years later, under the leadership of Omaha Mayor Jim Dahlman, the state legislators authorized the City of Omaha to assign the responsibility for operation of the gas system to the Metropolitan Water District. The name was changed to the Metropolitan Utilities District.

Operations

According to Nebraska State law, M.U.D. may enter contracts, promulgate regulations, set water and natural gas rates, buy, sell or lease land and issue revenue bonds. It can also can levy a water tax of 1.5 mills or less for fire protection, and collect sewer fees and other utility charges for other governmental agencies in areas where it provides water at retail.

Currently, M.U.D. provides natural gas service to 218,979 customers and provides water service to 203,320 customers. M.U.D's governing body is a seven-member board of directors, publicly elected to six-year terms on a nonpartisan basis.

CNG Filling stations
MUD operates a filling station for Compressed Natural Gas-powered vehicles near 64th & Center St in Omaha.  The station is one of three in the Omaha metro area.  The district also offers a $500 rebate to purchasers of CNG-powered vehicles.

See also
 Omaha Public Power District
 Government of Omaha, Nebraska
 Florence Water Works

References

Infrastructure in Omaha, Nebraska
Natural gas companies of the United States
Public utilities of the United States
Companies based in Nebraska
1913 establishments in Nebraska
Special Districts of Omaha, Nebraska